Little Walter DeVenne (January 16, 1948 – January 16, 2021) was an American radio personality who was for many years based in Boston, Massachusetts, and in New Hampshire and was the host of the syndicated retro oldies program Little Walter's Time Machine focusing on the pop, doo-wop, blues, R&B and early rock n' roll hits of the 1950s and early to mid-1960s, presented in the high-energy style of the Top 40 AM radio stations of that era.

Little Walter's Time Machine
His program was heard on oldies stations throughout the United States beginning in Boston on WBCN when it was Freeform FM in 1968 and into the early 1970s during the 50s "rock n' roll revival" period of that decade, gaining a following in syndication and later into "both sides of the millennium."

Remastering first-generation rock n' roll
DeVenne, being a connoisseur of old-school rock-n'-roll sound, was also in the business of remastering classic recordings of 45 RPM singles as released by the independent record labels of that era. His digital remastering work and compilation production work can be found on such compact disk releases as:
 The Doo-Wop Box, various artists (Rhino)
 La Salle Chicago Blues Recordings, Little Brother Montgomery (Wolf)
 The Best Of, Little Eva (Collectibles)
 Cherry Pie, Marvin & Johnny (Ace)
 The Very Best Of, Gary U.S. Bonds (Varese Sarabande)
 Muddy Waters - Live In Chicago 1979   

 Retirement from the airwaves
In 2005, DeVenne was diagnosed with cancer after cat scans and pet scans discovered lumps in his neck. Afterwards he underwent a successful surgery. Although cancer free since 2006, the longtime radio personality chose to cease production of the weekly oldies program which still runs in syndication across the country and online on iHeart Media's "Real Oldies Channel." DeVenne remained passionate about first generation rock and roll, his DJ appearances at nightclubs and his remastering business. He retired and, in 2016, left New Hampshire and moved to Brooksville, Florida.

Death
DeVenne was hospitalized with COVID-19 on January 2, 2021. He died from the virus in Brooksville, Florida, on January 16, 2021, his 73rd birthday, during the COVID-19 pandemic in Florida.

References

 Joe Viglione's article of Walter DeVenne's radio program and his battle with cancer.
 Both Sides Now Stereo Chat Board article

External links
 Real Oldies on iHeart Radio (WRIT HD-2 Milwaukee) 
 Little Walter's Time Machine tribute page on Archive.org
 Medialine story of Little Walter DeVenne's remastering work.
 Skyline Mastering Official site (Domain for sale)

1948 births
2021 deaths
American radio DJs
Radio personalities from Boston
Deaths from the COVID-19 pandemic in Florida